Nikola Pešaković (born April 16, 1991) is a Serbian professional basketball player for Vojvodina of the Basketball League of Serbia.

Professional career
Pešaković began his professional career with Borac Čačak in the 2009–10 season. In March 2011, Pešaković signed a four-year contract with Partizan. In January 2012, Pešaković was loaned to Borac Čačak until the end of the 2011–12 season.

In August 2012, Pešaković signed a one-year-plus-one-year contract with Vojvodina Srbijagas. In September 2013, he returned to his former club Borac Čačak. For the 2014–15 season, he signed with the Greek team Nea Kifissia. He averaged 6.2 points per game over the season.

On September 30, 2015, he signed a contract with the Bosnian team Igokea. He debuted for the team in 67–56 loss to Cedevita Zagreb in Round 1 of the ABA League, scoring 3 points in 13 minutes of action. After miserable performances in the beginning of the season, he scored season-high 18 points in a 75–58 victory over Sutjeska.

References

External links
 Nikola Pešaković at aba-liga.com
 Nikola Pešaković at draftexpress.com
 Nikola Pešaković at eurobasket.com
 Nikola Pešaković at esake.gr 

1991 births
Living people
ABA League players
Basketball League of Serbia players
Basketball players from Čačak
KK Borac Čačak players
KK Igokea players
KK Partizan players
KK Vojvodina Srbijagas players
Kecskeméti TE (basketball) players
Nea Kifissia B.C. players
Serbian expatriate basketball people in Bosnia and Herzegovina
Serbian expatriate basketball people in the Czech Republic
Serbian expatriate basketball people in Greece
Serbian expatriate basketball people in Hungary
Serbian expatriate basketball people in Romania
Serbian men's basketball players
Shooting guards